Football ranking can refer to
FIFA World Rankings
UEFA Rankings
World Football Elo Ratings